The 1925–26 League of Ireland was the fifth season of the League of Ireland.

Shelbourne won their first title.

Changes from 1924–25
Brooklyn were not re-elected to the League, while Brideville were elected.

Season Overview
It began on 29 August 1925 and ended on 3 January 1926. Shamrock Rovers were the defending champions.

Teams

Table

Results

Top goalscorers

Source:

See also
1925–26 FAI Cup

References

Ireland
League Of Ireland, 1925-26
League of Ireland seasons